"Follow Me" is a song by English singer Melanie C. Written by Melanie C, Billy Steinberg and Bryan Adams, it was originally recorded by Melanie C and released as a bonus track on the Japanese edition of Northern Star. It also appeared as a B-side on the single for the song of the same name.

Do version

"Follow Me" was covered by Dutch pop singer Do for her second album Follow Me, and was released as the first single from the album. The song was supposedly given to Do by co-writer Bryan Adams, as they have met each other several times after Do covered Adams's song "Heaven".

Track listing 
CD single
"Follow Me"
"Follow Me" (piano mix)

Video 
The video for "Follow Me" was shot in the Netherlands. The two locations were on a long road with several trees and the beach. Do is sitting in a car and singing the song. The video received little airtime on TMF, a Dutch music network.

Charts

References

1999 songs
2006 singles
Do (singer) songs
Songs written by Billy Steinberg
Songs written by Bryan Adams
Songs written by Melanie C
Sony BMG singles
Song recordings produced by Marius de Vries